Brandon Anthony Poltronieri  (born January 18, 1986), is an American-born-Costa Rican footballer.

Club career

Brujas FC
In 2006-2008,Poltronieri makes his first appearances in the club in the reserve team and eventually starts being called to the first team until he reaches one of the important players in the club as a rookie(Enforce the rule of players under 21)in Costa Rican FPD(Premier League)

Leixões S.C.
In Jul 1 2008,While at Brujas FC, Poltronieri went out on loan to Leixões SC of the Portuguese Premier League (Primeira Liga) be the first Costa Rican player to play in Portugal

CD Barrio México
Jul 1, 2009  he returned to Costa Rica, where he would play for Brujas FC and immediately go out on loan to CD Barrio Mexico(Grupo Ícono, The same owners of the 2 clubs) Helping the club in the second league (Liga de Asenso) and achieving to be champion to and go up promotion to the Premier League in Costa Rica

Jul 1, 2010-2011,poltronieri returned to Brujas FC to play the Costa Rican FPD( primary football competition) and play the 2010–11 CONCACAF Champions League Preliminary Round against Joe Public from Trinidad and Tobago

C.F. Universidad de Costa Rica
Jul 1, 2012-2013,Brandon in back to the second division (Liga de Asenso) key player for helping the team win the league and go to the Costa Rica FPD( primary football competition)

A.D. Carmelita

Jul 1, 2014,Poltronieri was transferred to the club in the middle of the season making 18 appearances and scoring 2 goals being key player for AD Carmelita

Atlanta Silverbacks FC

Feb 11, 2015,Signs a contract for Silverbacks only the fall season in NASL (North American Soccer League)  as the Division II league in the American league system, under Major League Soccer (MLS)

Ottawa Fury FC
Mar 26, 2016, Signs a contract with club, the team won the NASL Fall championship, and reached the Soccer Bowl, where they lost to the New York Cosmos

Arizona United
Mar 26, 2016, Poltronieri signed with Arizona United SC in the United Soccer League.

Honors

Ottawa Fury 

 NASL Fall Championship 2015

C.F. Universidad de Costa Rica

 Segunda División de Costa Rica Championship 2012–13

CD Barrio México
Champion Spring Season

References

External links

1986 births
Living people
People from Los Angeles
Soccer players from California
Costa Rican footballers
Costa Rican expatriate footballers
Costa Rican people of Italian descent
Expatriate soccer players in Canada
Brujas FC players
Leixões S.C. players
C.F. Universidad de Costa Rica footballers
A.D. Carmelita footballers
Atlanta Silverbacks players
Ottawa Fury FC players
Phoenix Rising FC players
Indy Eleven players
North American Soccer League players
USL Championship players
Costa Rica under-20 international footballers
Association football defenders
Association football midfielders